La Negrada internationally as Black Mexicans, is a 2018 Mexican drama film directed by Jorge Pérez Solano and produced by César Gutiérrez Miranda for Tirisia Cine. It is the first Mexican fiction movie with all Afro-Mexican cast in Mexico. The film has been shot in and around small towns throughout Costa Chica, Oaxaca.

The film has its premier on 18 August 2018 in The United States. The film received critical acclaim and later won the Best Cinematography Award at the 2018 Guadalajara International Film Festival.

International screenings
 African Diaspora Film Festival, USA – 18 August 2018
 Centro Cultural de España, Uruguay – 1 July 2019
 Hola Mexico Film Festival, USA – 4 June 2020

References

External links
 
 Daily Recommendation: LA NEGRADA
 'La Negrada' Becomes Mexico's First Fictional Film Starring An All-Black Mexican Cast
 "La Negrada": The recognition of Afro-Mexican communities on the big screen
 ‘La Negrada:’ Mexico’s First Fiction Film With An Entirely Black Cast

2018 films
Mexican drama films
2018 drama films